The South West African Labour and Farmers' Party was a political party in Namibia. It was founded on 25 November 1931.

References
Klaus Dierks Chronology of Namibian history: from pre-historical times to independent Namibia 1930–1931 Namibia Scientific Society, 1999 pg. 106

Defunct political parties in Namibia
Labour parties
Political parties established in 1931
1931 establishments in South West Africa